The Men's time trial H3 road cycling event at the 2016 Summer Paralympics took place on 14 September at Flamengo Park, Pontal. Twelve riders from nine nations competed.

The H3 category is a handcycle class is for cyclists with lower limb disabilities and  neurological dysfunction.

Results : Men's road time trial H3

References

Men's road time trial H3